Cleistanthus schlechteri is a plant species first described by Pax, with its current name after Hutchinson; it is included in the family Phyllanthaceae.

Subspecies and status
The following subspecies are listed in the Catalogue of Life:
 C. s. pubescens
 C. s. schlechteri

Cleistanthus schlechteri var. schlechteri (False Tamboti) is a protected tree in South Africa.

Description

General
Small tree (up to 6 m), deciduous, multi or single stemmed, fairly upright and minimally spreading crown. Many twigs and branches, trunks pale buff-grey, bark cracks into small, flat, more or less rectangular blocks.

Leaves
Simple, borne on very short, gnarled, lateral twigs. Very small, oval to obovate, smooth, glabrous, marginally entire, dark green and glossy above.

Flowers
Both the sexes are borne on separate trees in small bunches, yellow-green to pale green; (October/November).

Fruits
Capsules 10 x 8 mm, glabrous and glossy; brown to dark-brown when ripe (January/February).

References

schlechteri
Protected trees of South Africa